Joplin is a free and open-source desktop and mobile note-taking application written for Unix-like (including macOS and Linux) and Microsoft Windows operating systems, as well as iOS, Android, and Linux/Windows terminals, written in JavaScript. The desktop app is made using Electron, while the mobile app uses React Native.

History

Joplin is named after the ragtime composer and pianist, Scott Joplin.

Laurent Cozic started work on Joplin in 2016, and the first Android version was released on 28 July 2017.

The first public desktop application release was version 0.10.19, on November 20, 2017.

A Web Clipper for Chrome was introduced in December 2017 and the Firefox extension was released in May 2018.

A new Joplin Cloud service was introduced in 2021, along with an on-premises Joplin Server application. Both products can be used to sync notes, to-dos, notebooks and note data across devices, as well as share notes or notebooks with other Joplin users, or even publish content to the web.

Features
 Notes in markdown format
 Markdown extension plug-ins
 Storage in plain-text files
 Optional client-side encryption
 Organisation in notebooks and sub-notebooks
 Tagging system
 "Offline-first", notes are always accessible locally, and can be synced on demand
 Web clipper for Firefox and Chrome
 Note synchronization with Joplin Cloud, Nextcloud, Dropbox, OneDrive, WebDAV, or (networked) file system

Joplin's workflow and featureset is most often compared to Evernote.

See also
 Comparison of note-taking software

References

External links

 
 Demonstration videos:
 Joplin Is An Open Source Alternative To Evernote
 Joplin, a free, open source, self hosted syncing note taking alternative to Evernote and OneNote

Free and open-source Android software
Free note-taking software
Free software programmed in JavaScript
iOS software
Linux software
MacOS software
Windows software